Nyando district was a former district in Kenya which broke away from Kisumu District in Nyanza Province in 1998. Nyando district bordered the Rift Valley Province. The district is named after the Nyando River. 

Its capital was a small town called Awasi, located 30 kilometres east of the Kisumu. Other towns and villages in the district included Muhoroni, Chemelil, Ahero, Miwani, Koru, Kibigori, and Fort Ternan.

In 2010, the district was eliminated and merged into Kisumu County.

Electoral constituencies
The district had three electoral constituencies:
Muhoroni Constituency
Nyakach Constituency
Nyando Constituency

External links 
 Map of Kisumu District (before Nyando District was created)

 
Former districts of Kenya